Batel is a village and sub-district in Dohuk Governorate in Kurdistan Region, Iraq. It is located in the Simele District.

Gallery

References

Populated places in Dohuk Province
Kurdish settlements in Iraq
Simele
Subdistricts of Iraq